The Tiwi Islands Region is a local government area (LGA) of the Northern Territory, Australia.

History
In October 2006 the Northern Territory Government announced the reform of local government areas. The intention of the reform was to improve and expand the delivery of services to towns and communities across the Northern Territory by establishing eleven new shires. The Tiwi Islands Shire Council was created on 1 July 2008 as were the remaining ten shires.

The Tiwi Islands Shire Council became the Tiwi Islands Regional Council under legislation passed by the Northern Territory Government in January 2014.

Description and governance

Elections of Councillors were held on 26 August 2017. The current Mayor of the Tiwi Islands Region is Gawin Tipiloura.

Wards
The Tiwi Islands Regional Council is divided into three wards, which is governed by 12 councillors:
 Bathurst                  (6)
 Milikapiti                (3)
 Pirlangimpi               (3)

Localities and communities
Land within the Tiwi Islands Region was divided during 2007 into bounded areas for the purpose of creating an address for a property.  The bounded areas are called "localities" with those localities associated with existing aboriginal communities being called "communities".

Localities
Tiwi Islands

Communities
Milikapiti
Pirlangimpi
Wurrumiyanga

Demographics
The demographics of the region are shown in the tables below.

Ancestry

Birthplace
Before 2016, all Tiwi Islanders who stated their country of birth were born in Australia. Between 2011 and 2016, however, over ten arrivals each from the Philippines, the United Kingdom and Fiji arrived in the islands.

Language

Language spoken at home

Proficiency in English

Religion

Notes

References

External links
Tiwi Islands Regional Council website
Map of LGAs
Policy details

Tiwi Islands Local Government